Engirundho Vandhaal is a 1970 Indian Tamil-language film, directed by A. C. Tirulokchandar and produced by K. Balaji. The film stars Sivaji Ganesan and Jayalalithaa, with K. Balaji, M. Bhanumathi, Nagesh, Sundarrajan and Raja in supporting roles. It is a remake of the 1963 Telugu film Punarjanma, which in turn was based on the novel Patthar Ke Honth by Gulshan Nanda. The film was released on 29 October 1970, and became a silver jubilee hit.  It later won the Filmfare Award for Best Film – Tamil.

Plot 
Sekar has lost his mind being forced to witness the betrayal by his lover and his friend as they get married to each other though the situation was manipulated by his friend Sukumar. She commits suicide on the stage by setting herself to fire driving him insane. 

The family property is still in his name and is enjoyed by the rest of the family who treat him badly but keep him alive so that they can enjoy it. When forced to get a nurse, they instead get Radha, a courtesan, and present her as a nurse. However, her tender love and affection slowly turns Sekar back into the road of sanity. Seeing that he is getting better, they venture to fire her. One thing leads to another and in the end, Sekar manages to save Radha from fire, thereby redeeming himself from his earlier failure to save his lover and getting sane again. They get married and forgive the relatives.

Cast 
Sivaji Ganesan as Gunasekar (alis) Sekar
Jayalalithaa as Radha (alis) Kamala
K. Balaji as Dhanasekar
Nagesh as Viswanathan
Major Sundarrajan as Pattavarayan
Raja as Sukumar
Nagayya as Dharmalingam
Typist Gopu as Victor
Rama Prabha as Parvathi
Sachu as Rita
Aranmula Ponnamma as Shanthavalli
M. Bhanumathi as Mohana
Jayakumari as Kavitha
Baby Sumathi as Dhanasekar's daughter
Devika as Amuthavalli
Muthuraman as Chandran
Thengai Srinivasan as Viswanathan's friend
Kuladeivam Rajagopal as Samiyaar

Production 
Ganesan's home, Annai Illam, features in the film.

Soundtrack 
The soundtrack was composed by M. S. Viswanathan, with lyrics by Kannadasan.

Release and reception 
Engirundho Vandhaal was released on 29 October 1970, alongside another Sivaji Ganesan starrer Sorgam. The Indian Express wrote, "There are some touching scenes. The music by M. S. Viswanathan is passable. Comedy by Thengai Srinivasan and Nagesh, though unwarranted, is enjoyable." The film became a silver jubilee hit, and went on to win the Filmfare Award for Best Film – Tamil.

References

External links 
 

1970 drama films
1970 films
1970s Tamil-language films
Films directed by A. C. Tirulokchandar
Films scored by M. S. Viswanathan
Tamil remakes of Telugu films